The rufous-breasted blue flycatcher (Cyornis camarinensis)  is a species of bird in the family Muscicapidae. It is endemic to the Philippines.  Its natural habitat is subtropical or tropical moist lowland forests. It was formerly treated as a subspecies of the blue-breasted blue flycatcher (Cyornis herioti).

References

rufous-breasted blue flycatcher
Birds of Luzon
Birds described in 1967